Spilios Livanos (born 20 September 1967) is a Greek politician. On 5 January 2021, he was appointed Minister for Rural Development and Food in the cabinet of Prime Minister Kyriakos Mitsotakis. He resigned on 7 February 2022, after footage emerged of controversial remarks he had made about the 2007 Greek forest fires.

References 

Living people
1967 births
Politicians from Athens
Government ministers of Greece
Agriculture ministers of Greece
New Democracy (Greece) politicians
Greek MPs 2019–2023